A conventional pollutant is a term used in the USA to describe a water pollutant that is amenable to treatment by a municipal sewage treatment plant.  A basic list of conventional pollutants is defined in the U.S. Clean Water Act. The list has been amended in regulations issued by the Environmental Protection Agency:
 biochemical oxygen demand (BOD)
 fecal coliform bacteria
 oil and grease
 pH (exceeding regulatory limits)
 total suspended solids (TSS).

The Secondary Treatment Regulation contains national discharge standards for BOD, pH and TSS, applicable to sewage treatment plants in the U.S.

See also
 Secondary treatment
 Wastewater quality indicators
 Water quality
Criteria pollutants, a similar list of pollutants of air

References

Environmental engineering
Water pollution
Water quality indicators